The British Rail Class 203, initially classified 6B, was a type of diesel-electric train. Seven units, numbered 1031-1037, were constructed in 1958 for use on the Southern Region. They were similar to the earlier Class 202 units, differing only in the substitution of a trailer buffet car for one of the three trailer second opens.

Operations
The units were delivered in 1958 in then-standard British Railways green livery. They worked initially on the Hastings–Tonbridge–London /Cannon Street line.

In 1963, the number of buffet cars was reduced to five to reflect falling demand, with units 1031 and 1032 losing the carriages; 1031 was converted to standard 6L (202) formation while 1032 lost another car to replace a damaged car in another unit and ran with two TFKs, downgraded to TSK, from Class 201; the rest of these units were used in the formation of 3R(206) "Tadpole" units 1201-1206. The TSKs were later transferred to a 6S(201) unit and replaced with two standard 6L(202) TSOs and 1032 became another standard Class 202 unit. The two buffet cars removed from the units were stored and later converted for departmental use.

Between 1972 and 1977 two units worked a –Southampton–– service and return on Saturdays only.

At least one Class 203 unit was repainted in all-over Rail Blue with the carriage numbers repositioned higher, before all five remaining buffet units became blue and grey. Yellow squares and later yellow ends were added during repainting. In the 1980s the remaining five buffet cars were withdrawn and scrapped. The remaining five Class 203s became five-car units, with one shortened to four cars to run the – shuttle when the Tunbridge Wells- service was withdrawn as part of the Tonbridge–Bopeep Junction electrification scheme.

Upon the completion of this scheme almost all Class 201, 202 and 203 units were withdrawn, although a motor brake second open and trailer composite corridor (TCK) were used briefly to reinstate Class 206 unit 1206. Class 202 "6L" Unit 1011, however, continued in service as a 4-car unit. For unclear reasons it was renumbered into the Class 203 sequence when the TOPS system was introduced, becoming 203001. It was used on the Marshlink Line until 1990, when it was converted for departmental use and renumbered 1067. It was again renumbered, to 1067, and repainted into Network SouthEast livery. It was withdrawn in 1994.

Technical details
Power car (two per six-car set)

 Introduced: 1958
 Weight: 55 tons
 Transmission: Electric, two English Electric type 507 traction motors of 
 Maximum tractive effort: Not known
 Driving wheel diameter: Not known
 Coupling code: Not known
 Train heating: Electric

Preservation
Two vehicles survive: DB975025 Caroline and S60750. S60750, the buffet removed car from unit 1031 in 1963, had been used for tilt tests in the 1980s for the Advanced Passenger Train. This vehicle was fitted with a centre executive section, a urinal, and a classroom at one end which also had windows fitted for use when the vehicle was propelled at the Old Dalby test track, and was later used for airflow tests before being rescued first by Hastings Diesels Ltd at St. Leonards Depot and subsequently by the Hastings 60750 Group. In 2011 the vehicle came under the care of the APT-E Conservation and Support Group and moved to the Electric Railway Museum, Warwickshire near Coventry.

See also
British Rail Classes 201, 202 and 203

References

Further reading

External links
 Hastings Diesels Ltd

203
Diesel electric multiple units
Train-related introductions in 1958